Replenishment is a component in the processing of photographic film and paper, where fresh chemistry is used to replace exhausted chemistry in a continuous or per-batch fashion. Replenishment rates are calculated by the quantity of film processed in each individual bath; as well as by the amount of film push-processed in the E-6 process; and by film type in the C-41 process.

C-41 and C41-RA process replenishing 

   
C-41 color developer exhaustion volumes vary according to the speed and contrast of the films. Please see Table 3-2 in chapter 3 of the Kodak Process C-41 Processing Manual Z-131 to see the different color developer exhaustion rates for the various Kodak color negative films.

External links
Kodak process E6 Ektachrome (color transparency) processing manual Z-119
Kodak process E6 Q-LAB processing manual Z-6 (more details than processing manual Z119 above)
Kodak RA-4 process lab manual Z-130

Photographic processes